Sennfeld is a municipality  in the district of Schweinfurt in Bavaria, Germany.  Historically, along with its neighboring village of Gochsheim, it had the rare situation of being a Reichsdorf or Imperial Village.

References

Schweinfurt (district)
Imperial Villages